James Edward Hindson (born 13 September 1973) is an English cricketer.  Hindson is a right-handed batsman who bowls slow left-arm orthodox.  He was born at Huddersfield, Yorkshire.

Hindson made his first-class debut for Nottinghamshire against Cambridge University in 1992.  From 1992 to 1997, he represented the county in 28 first-class matches, the last of which came against Glamorgan in the County Championship.  In his 28 first-class matches, he scored 384 runs at a batting average of 13.24, with a single half century high score of 53*, while in the field he took 14 catches.  With the ball he took 93 wickets at a bowling average of 32.74.  He took five wickets in an innings 7 times and 10 tens wickets in a match twice, with best innings bowling figures of 5/42.

It was for Nottinghamshire that he made his debut in List A cricket during the 1994 AXA Equity and Law League against Worcestershire.  From 1994 to 1998, he represented the county in 26 List A matches, the last of which came against the touring South Africans.  He later represented the Nottinghamshire Cricket Board in List A matches, making his debut for the Board against the Gloucestershire Cricket Board in the 2000 NatWest Trophy.  From 2000 to 2002, he represented the Board in 4 List A matches, the last of which came against Cumberland in the 1st round of the 2003 Cheltenham & Gloucester Trophy which was played in 2002.  In total, Hindson played 30 List A matches, during which he scored 174 runs at an average of 21.75, with a high score of 41*, while in the field he took 9 catches.  With the ball he took 21 wickets at an average of 46.09, with best figures of 4/19.

He currently plays club cricket for Kimberley Institute Cricket Club in the Nottinghamshire Cricket Board Premier League.

References

External links
James Hindson at Cricinfo

1973 births
Living people
Cricketers from Huddersfield
English cricketers
Nottinghamshire cricketers
Nottinghamshire Cricket Board cricketers